An imaginarium is a place devoted to the imagination. There are various types of imaginaria, centers largely devoted to stimulating and cultivating the imagination, towards scientific, artistic, commercial, recreational, or spiritual ends.

Examples
 The Imaginarium Discovery Center is a children's science discovery center within the Anchorage Museum in Anchorage in the U.S. state of Alaska.
 The Imaginarium of South Texas is a children's museum and informal science center at Mall del Norte in Laredo, Texas.
 The Imaginarium Science Center is a science museum and aquarium in Fort Myers, Florida.  It features science exhibits, a 3-D theatre, dinosaurs, aquarium displays, a touch tank with stingrays and more.
 The Imaginarium Science Centre of Devonport, Tasmania is a hands-on science museum that is part of Pandemonium: Discovery and Adventure Centre.

In popular culture
 In The Imaginarium of Doctor Parnassus, the immortal mystic Doctor Parnassus runs a nomadic theater troupe who lure people through a mirror that shows them a world of their deepest subconscious desires, where their souls are put to the test.

References

Tourist attractions
Types of museums
Imagination